The Green Bay Packers Fan Hall of Fame (capitalized by the organization as the Green Bay Packers FAN Hall of Fame) was the first hall of fame built to honor fans of a professional football team.  It was established by the Green Bay Packers and the Green Bay Packers Hall of Fame in 1998.  Fans may nominate themselves or others for inductions by submitting an essay of 500 words or less, accompanied by a photo or a two-minute video, explaining why they or another person are the ultimate Packers fan and deserve recognition.  Ten finalists are chosen by a selection committee composed of members of the Packer Hall of Fame board and members of the Green Bay Packers' front office, and are profiled in the Milwaukee Journal Sentinel, as well as on the Packers' website.  Fans are then given an opportunity to vote on the 10 finalists whose stories were profiled.

The nominee who receives the most votes each year is named as the honorary fan and is inducted into the FAN Hall of Fame.  The fan receives four club seats to a Packers home game (with their name announced on the Lambeau Field replay board), a $500 Packers Pro Shop gift certificate and a road trip for two to a Green Bay away game.  The honoree is also introduced during the annual Packer Hall of Fame induction dinner, held each July, and has his or her name displayed on a plaque in the Packer Hall of Fame, in the atrium of Lambeau Field.

Inductees

References

Green Bay Packers lists
Halls of fame in Wisconsin
American football museums and halls of fame
Sports fandom
Awards established in 1998